The Taiping Sky Bridge is a suspension bridge in Meishan Township, Chiayi County, Taiwan. It is the longest suspension bridge in Taiwan.

History
The bridge was inaugurated on 20 August 2017 in a ceremony attended by Chiayi Magistrate Helen Chang. It then opened on 23 September 2017.

Architecture
The bridge spans over a length of 281 meters with a height of about 1,000 meters above sea level. The bridge is decorated with lamps which are lighted up differently every evening following the colors of the rainbow.

See also
 Transportation in Taiwan

References

2017 establishments in Taiwan
Bridges completed in 2017
Suspension bridges in Chiayi County
Tourist attractions in Chiayi County